This article lists the Ministers of Health of Brazil.

List

References 

 
Health minister
Brazil